The Kiribati passport is an international travel document issued for citizens of Kiribati.

Visa requirements 

By January 2020, Kiribati had visa-free or visa-on-arrival access to 122 countries and dependencies, making the Kiribati passport ranking 48th on the Visa Restrictions Index.

See also 

Visa requirements for Kiribati citizens

References 

Foreign relations of Kiribati
Government of Kiribati
Kiribati
Kiribati and the Commonwealth of Nations